The A67 is a road in England that links Bowes in County Durham with Crathorne in North Yorkshire. The road from Middlesbrough to Darlington was previously the A66 road.

Route
The section from the A66 to Barnard Castle is primary status; from that point it turns right and it loses its primary status to the A688 road. It then travels east through Gainford and crosses the A1(M) but does not have a junction with it. The road regains primary status as it goes concurrent with the A66 road from the Blackwell roundabout and heads along the southern edge of Darlington.

As the A66 heads north, the A67 leaves at Morton Park to head east past Dinsdale and Durham Tees Valley Airport before joining with the A135 in Eaglescliffe. From there it heads south through Yarm and Kirklevington before joining the A19 road at Crathorne.

The road has been described by a UK Government transport minister as an important commuter route and as being the gateway to Teesdale from Darlington. Despite its status as an important route, it is not maintained by Highways England but by the local authority. The section around Darlington and also onwards towards Middlesbrough was originally the A66.

Safety
The  stretch road between the A66 at Morton Park and the A19 was named the third most improved road in 2013. Work on this section included vehicle activated signage, draining and re-surfacing.

Settlements 

Bowes (junction with A66 road)
Barnard Castle
Gainford
Piercebridge
Darlington
Teesside International Airport
Eaglescliffe
Yarm
Crathorne (junction with A19 road)

References

External links

Roads in England
Roads in Yorkshire
Transport in County Durham
Transport in North Yorkshire